Kanyarat Gatethonglang (born 6 October 1999) is a Thai professional racing cyclist, who most recently rode for UCI Women's Continental Team .

References

External links
 

1999 births
Living people
Kanyarat Gatethonglang
Place of birth missing (living people)
Kanyarat Gatethonglang